Prince of Sulmona (Italian: Principe di Sulmona) was a noble title of Italian origin. The title derives its name from Sulmona, a town in Abruzzo.

It was originally granted in 1526 with Grandeeship of Spain, during the reign of Charles V, Holy Roman Emperor as King of Naples, in recognition of the work done by Charles de Lannoy as Viceroy of Naples. That line of princes died out in 1604.

The title was recreated in 1610 for Pope Paul V's nephew Marcantonio Borghese by King Philip III of Spain, in his capacity as king of Naples (just like in England, prince titles were alien to the Spanish peerage tradition). King Philip III sold the principality and the town of Sulmona to the Borghese Family, and the title still remains in this family. After the unification of Italy, the title was recognized by the new Kingdom of Italy.

House of Lannoy, 1526–1604 
 Charles de Lannoy (1482-1527), Viceroy of Naples, 1st Prince of Sulmona
 Philippe Charles II de Lannoy (1514-1553), 2nd Prince of Sulmona
 Charles III de Lannoy (1537-1568), 3rd Prince of Sulmona
 Horace de Lannoy (d. 1597), 4th Prince of Sulmona
 Philippe de Lannoy (d. 1600), 5th Prince of Sulmona
 Philippe II de Lannoy (d. 1604), 6th Prince of Sulmona

House of Borghese, 1610–present

References

House of Borghese
Italian nobility
Sulmona
 
Sulmona